The 2011–12 NHL season was the 95th season of operation (94th season of play) of the National Hockey League (NHL). The Los Angeles Kings defeated the New Jersey Devils in the Stanley Cup Final four games to two to win the team's first Stanley Cup in their second Stanley Cup final appearance; they had lost to Montreal Canadiens in the 1993 Finals.

During the off-season, the Atlanta Thrashers relocated to Winnipeg, Manitoba, to become the "new" Winnipeg Jets (the "old” Winnipeg Jets relocated in 1996 to become the Arizona Coyotes. It was the first NHL team relocation since the 1997–98 season, when the Hartford Whalers relocated to become the Carolina Hurricanes. The league did not change its divisional structure to accommodate the move, and the Jets took the place of the Thrashers in the Southeast Division. In December 2011, the board of governors eventually approved a proposed realignment for the following season, which would result in four conferences with the first two rounds of the playoffs being divisional, but this was rejected by the NHL Players' Association (NHLPA).

It was the fifth consecutive season with games in Europe at the start of the season. The Winter Classic was held on January 2, 2012, in Philadelphia between the Philadelphia Flyers and the New York Rangers. The 59th All-Star Game was held at Scotiabank Place in Ottawa, Ontario, the home arena of the Ottawa Senators, on January 29, 2012.

League business

Franchise relocation
Atlanta Spirit, LLC, which previously owned the Atlanta Thrashers, sold the team to True North Sports and Entertainment, who relocated them to the True North-owned MTS Centre in Winnipeg, Manitoba and renamed the Winnipeg Jets, after a previous NHL team in the market. Winnipeg took Atlanta's place in the Southeast Division for 2011–12.

Salary cap
On June 23, 2011, the NHL announced that the salary cap would be increased by $4.9 million. As a result, the new salary cap ceiling was set at $64.3 million while the salary cap floor was $48.3 million.

Uniform changes
Several teams announced plans to change their uniforms in the 2011–12 season.

The Edmonton Oilers unveiled a new away uniform parallel to their "retro" home uniform used from 1979 to 1996. They retained the navy blue, copper and red uniforms as their alternates.

The Nashville Predators unveiled new home and away uniforms on June 22, complete with the updated saber-toothed cat logo. Their use of gold as the home colors marked the first time since 1988 that an NHL team wore gold in their home uniforms.

The Florida Panthers made minor changes to their home uniform, using red as the primary and relegating navy blue as a trim color.

The Los Angeles Kings returned to the silver and black motif they used from 1988 to 1998, by designating their alternate home black and silver uniform as a regular uniform and unveiling a new white away uniform with black and silver trim. The purple and black uniform were retained as an alternate uniform.

The Ottawa Senators unveiled a new alternate home uniform based on the original Senators barber pole design. The uniform does not use the Roman centurion logo, instead using an outlined "O" on stripes. The Senators' uniform will also have an All-Star Game patch.

The Pittsburgh Penguins promoted their dark blue uniforms, worn during the 2011 NHL Winter Classic, as the home alternates, replacing the 2008 NHL Winter Classic alternates.

The Tampa Bay Lightning unveiled new home and road uniforms, featuring the simplified lightning logo. Originally the uniforms were simply blue and white, but by popular demand, black was added as a trim color to the uniform numbers, and added the lightning bolt to the pants. The "Bolts" alternate home uniform was retained.

The Toronto Maple Leafs unveiled a new alternate home uniform based on the Leafs uniforms worn during their run to the 1967 Stanley Cup title, including the 11-point maple leaf logo.

The Washington Capitals also promoted their 2011 NHL Winter Classic retro uniforms as their road alternates.

The new Winnipeg Jets unveiled uniforms consisting of navy with silver and light blue trim, containing a logo based on the roundel of the Royal Canadian Air Force; these were significantly different from, but in a similar color scheme to, the original Jets uniforms.

The New York Islanders unveiled a new black alternate uniform, featuring the team name above the player's number, a similar template the Dallas Stars' uniforms currently use. Speaking of the Stars, they officially retired their alternate away jersey featuring the team crest, instead using their regular away jerseys with the city name and number in front for all 41 road games.

The New York Rangers and Philadelphia Flyers wore special commemorative uniforms for the 2012 NHL Winter Classic. The Flyers unveiled theirs on November 21, and is in a classic sweater design in orange featuring black numbers and different striping patterns on the yoke. The Rangers unveiled theirs on November 28, and features a mix of designs used from previous jerseys. The shield logo in front is a variation of the logos used during the 1930s–1940s, while the shoulder, arm and tail striping was taken from the current jersey. Both teams would wear their Winter Classic uniforms again on February 5 and 11 at Madison Square Garden and Wells Fargo Center respectively, with the away team wearing the regular uniforms.

In addition several teams sported memorial patches throughout the season; many of these memorials were for related events (see "Off-Season" section below). Unless specified, the patches were seen on the team helmets:
Anaheim Ducks – Ruslan Salei (24) memorial on uniforms
Calgary Flames – Harley Hotchkiss (HH) memorial
Carolina Hurricanes – Josef Vasicek (63) memorial; worn on uniforms
Dallas Stars – Karlis Skrastins (37) memorial
Detroit Red Wings – Brad McCrimmon, Ruslan Salei and Stefan Liv (BM·RS·SL) memorial; worn on uniforms
Minnesota Wild – Pavol Demitra (38) and Derek Boogaard (24) memorials
Nashville Predators – Wade Belak (3) memorial
New York Islanders – 40th anniversary of the franchise; worn on uniforms
New York Rangers – Derek Boogaard (94) memorial
Vancouver Canucks – Rick Rypien (37) memorial
Winnipeg Jets – Rick Rypien (RR) memorial
St. Louis Blues – Pavol Demitra and Igor Korolev (38) memorial

Furthermore, a new league-wide rule required that player numbers be displayed on the front of their helmets, as well as on the back.

Even though the New Jersey Devils and the Phoenix Coyotes unveiled anniversary logos commemorating their 30th and 15th anniversaries of their respective relocations from Colorado and Winnipeg, they opted not to use them on their uniforms or helmets.

Rule changes
Boarding
Prior to the 2011–12 season, the Board of Governors unanimously agreed to update and re-word rule 41 involving boarding penalties. The new wording requires the player delivering the check to avoid or minimize contact if the opponent is defenceless.

Illegal hits to the head
The Board of Governors also approved an update to rule 48 involving illegal checks to the head. The new rule will penalize all hits where the head is the principal point of contact. The previous version of this rule only made checks from the blindside illegal. However, determination if the check is legal will depend on various factors including whether or not the player put himself in a vulnerable position or if the hit was unavoidable. A two-minute minor penalty, or a major penalty in the event the hit was deemed to be deliberate with intent to injure, may be assessed.

Off-season
Three young (under 40) "enforcer"-type players died within a four-month span during the off-season. The deaths of Derek Boogaard, Rick Rypien and Wade Belak led to speculation about the effect of fighting on the mental health of players.

Several former NHL players died in the 2011 Lokomotiv Yaroslavl plane crash involving the Kontinental Hockey League (KHL) Lokomotiv Yaroslavl hockey team in Russia. Those who perished in the plane crash included NHL All-Star Pavol Demitra, Alexander Karpovtsev, Igor Korolev, Brad McCrimmon, Karel Rachunek, Ruslan Salei, Karlis Skrastins and Josef Vasicek along with nearly the entire team roster, coaches, and several young prospects.

Pre-season

European exhibition games

The four teams going to Europe to open their regular seasons there as part of the NHL Premiere games also played exhibition games against European teams under the banner of NHL Premiere Challenge to close out their pre-seasons. The NHL teams had an overall record of 6–1–0 against the European teams, with the New York Rangers, playing four games in five days in four countries, having a record of 3–1–0.

Regular season

Premiere games

Four teams participated in the 2011 Compuware NHL Premiere in Europe. The Anaheim Ducks, Los Angeles Kings and New York Rangers made their second trip to Europe while the Buffalo Sabres made its first trip. On October 7, Anaheim played Buffalo at Hartwall Areena in Helsinki, Finland, and Los Angeles faced New York at the Ericsson Globe Arena in Stockholm, Sweden. All four teams played again on October 8 with Los Angeles against Buffalo at the O2 World Arena in Berlin, Germany, and Anaheim against New York in Stockholm.

Thanksgiving Showdown
As part of the league's updated television contract, the NHL debuted the Thanksgiving Showdown, a nationally broadcast game on the day after American Thanksgiving in 2011. The game, which was sponsored by Discover, featured the Boston Bruins (who have traditionally hosted Black Friday matinées since 1990) hosting the Detroit Red Wings, with Detroit winning the game in a shootout, 3–2.

2012 Winter Classic
The 2012 NHL Winter Classic was held at the Citizens Bank Park baseball stadium in Philadelphia, Pennsylvania, on Monday, January 2, 2012. This season, the Philadelphia Flyers hosted the New York Rangers. It was the first Winter Classic game for the Rangers and the second for the Flyers. The result of the game was a 3–2 Ranger victory. Philadelphia last played in the 2010 NHL Winter Classic against the Boston Bruins at Fenway Park in Boston, Massachusetts. The Bruins won that game in overtime by a score of 2–1 on a goal scored by Marco Sturm.

This was the first time that the Winter Classic was not played on New Year's Day, which fell on a Sunday in 2012. If the Winter Classic was held on New Year's Day, it would have conflicted with the final game of the National Football League season (in which the Philadelphia Eagles hosted the Washington Redskins at nearby Lincoln Financial Field), and the annual Mummers Parade in downtown Philadelphia. The Flyers–Rangers rivalry is one of the NHL's most frequently televised rivalries on U.S. television networks; it was televised three times nationally on NBC in 2011–12, including the inaugural Hockey Day in America.

No Heritage Classic was played this season.

Standings
Each of the 30 teams play an 82-game season of an unbalanced schedule. Teams play six games against division opponents; four games against other conference opponents; and one or two games against teams of the other conference. The first-place teams in each division place first, second and third in the conference standings. The top five finishers from the rest of the teams in each conference will also qualify for the playoffs, making a total of eight playoff teams in each conference.

Attendance

Notes
 Totals do not include four regular-season opening games played in Europe, and one outdoor regular season game. 
 The Buffalo Sabres played one home game against the Anaheim Ducks at Hartwall Areena in Helsinki, Finland.
 The Anaheim Ducks played one home game against the New York Rangers at the Ericsson Globe in Stockholm, Sweden
 The Los Angeles Kings played two home games, one against the New York Rangers at Ericsson Globe in Stockholm, Sweden, and one against the Buffalo Sabres at O2 World in Berlin, Germany.
 The Philadelphia Flyers played the New York Rangers outdoors in the Winter Classic at Citizens Bank Park in Philadelphia, Pennsylvania.

Playoffs

Bracket

NHL awards 

Awards were presented at the NHL Awards ceremony, held in Las Vegas, Nevada, on June 20, 2012. Finalists for voted awards are announced during the playoffs and winners are presented at the award ceremony. Voting concluded immediately after the end of the regular season. The Presidents' Trophy, the Prince of Wales Trophy and Clarence S. Campbell Bowl are not presented at the awards ceremony. The Lester Patrick Trophy is announced during the summer and presented in the fall.

All-Star teams

Source: NHL.

Player statistics

Scoring leaders
The following players lead the league in points at the conclusion of the regular season.

GP = Games played; G = Goals; A = Assists; Pts = Points; +/– = Plus-minus; PIM = Penalty minutes

Leading goaltenders
The following goaltenders led the league in goals against average at the end of the regular season while playing at least 1,800 minutes.

GP = Games played; Min = Minutes played; W = Wins; L = Losses; OT = Overtime/shootout losses; GA = Goals against; SO = Shutouts; SV% = Save percentage; GAA = Goals against average

Coaching changes

Offseason
Dallas Stars: Glen Gulutzan replaced the fired Marc Crawford.
Florida Panthers: Kevin Dineen replaced the fired Peter DeBoer.
Minnesota Wild: Mike Yeo replaced the fired Todd Richards.
New Jersey Devils: Peter DeBoer was named as head coach for the 2011–12 season. John MacLean had been fired as head coach midway through the 2010–11 season, and Jacques Lemaire, who had retired, served as interim head coach.
New York Islanders: This was Jack Capuano's first full season after replacing Scott Gordon on November 15, 2010.
Ottawa Senators: Paul MacLean replaced the fired Cory Clouston.
Winnipeg Jets: Claude Noel replaced Craig Ramsay following the former-Atlanta Thrashers' relocation to Winnipeg.

In-season
Anaheim Ducks: Randy Carlyle was fired on November 30, 2011, and replaced by Bruce Boudreau the same day
Los Angeles Kings: On December 12, 2011, Terry Murray was fired and John Stevens served as interim, until Darryl Sutter was named team's head coach on December 20, 2011.
Montreal Canadiens: Jacques Martin was fired on December 17, 2011, and assistant coach Randy Cunneyworth served as interim head coach for the remainder of the season.
St. Louis Blues: Ken Hitchcock replaced Davis Payne on November 6, 2011.
Toronto Maple Leafs: Randy Carlyle replaced Ron Wilson on March 2, 2012.
Washington Capitals: Bruce Boudreau was fired on November 28, 2011, and replaced by interim Dale Hunter.

Milestones

First games

The following is a list of notable players who played their first NHL game in 2011–12, listed with their first team:

Last games

The following is a list of players of note who played their last NHL game in 2011–12, listed with their team:

Major milestones reached

On October 6, 2011, Philadelphia Flyers forward Jaromir Jagr recorded his 1,600th NHL point. He became the ninth player in league history to reach this milestone.
On October 20, 2011, Montreal Canadiens defenceman Hal Gill participated in his 1,000th NHL game.
On October 21, 2011, San Jose Sharks forward Joe Thornton participated in his 1,000th NHL game.
On October 22, 2011, Detroit Red Wings defenceman Nicklas Lidstrom participated in his 1,500th NHL game. He became the first European born (and 14th overall) player to play 1,500 NHL games.
On November 12, 2011, Nashville Predators coach Barry Trotz and Los Angeles Kings coach Terry Murray both coached their 1,000th NHL games in separate contests. They became the 20th and 21st coaches in league history to reach this milestone.
On November 16, 2011, New Jersey Devils forward Dainius Zubrus participated in his 1,000th NHL game.
On November 25, 2011, Columbus Blue Jackets forward Vaclav Prospal participated in his 1,000th NHL game.
On December 18, 2011, Chicago Blackhawks coach Joel Quenneville won his 600th game as an NHL coach. He became the tenth coach in league history to reach this milestone. He became the second fastest coach in league history to reach the milestone in 1,113 games (Scotty Bowman, currently a Blackhawks senior advisor, did it in 1,002 games).
On December 20, 2011, Washington Capitals forward Mike Knuble participated in his 1,000th NHL game.
On December 26, 2011, Carolina Hurricanes goaltender Cam Ward was credited with scoring a goal. He is the tenth goaltender to achieve this in league history.
On January 1, 2012, Calgary Flames forward Olli Jokinen participated in his 1,000th NHL game.
On January 6, 2012, New Jersey Devils forward Patrik Elias participated in his 1,000th NHL game.
On January 7, 2012, Calgary Flames forward Jarome Iginla recorded his 500th career goal. He became the 42nd player in league history to reach this milestone.
On January 10, 2012, Minnesota Wild forward Matt Cullen participated in his 1,000th NHL game.
On January 14, 2012, New York Islanders goaltender Evgeni Nabokov recorded his 300th career win. He became the 26th goaltender in league history to reach this milestone.
On February 2, 2012, Edmonton Oilers forward Sam Gagner registered eight points (four goals and four assists) in one game. He became the 13th player in league history to achieve this.
On February 8, 2012, Calgary Flames goaltender Miikka Kiprusoff recorded his 300th career win. He became the 27th goaltender in league history to reach this milestone.
On February 9, 2012, Ottawa Senators defenceman Chris Phillips participated in his 1,000th NHL game.
On February 10, 2012, Detroit Red Wings forward Tomas Holmstrom participated in his 1,000th NHL game.
On February 14, 2012, the Detroit Red Wings set a new NHL record for consecutive home wins at 21 straight with a 3–1 win over the Dallas Stars. The previous record of 20 consecutive wins was originally set by the Boston Bruins in 1929–30 and tied by the Philadelphia Flyers in 1975–76. The new record is 23 consecutive home wins.
On February 27, 2012, New York Rangers goaltender Henrik Lundqvist recorded his 30th win of the season, making him the only goaltender in NHL history to record seven consecutive 30-win seasons to begin his career.
On March 4, 2012, New Jersey Devils forward Petr Sykora participated in his 1,000th NHL game.
On March 11, 2012, Pittsburgh Penguins center Evgeni Malkin scored his 500th career point.
On March 12, 2012, Anaheim Ducks forward Saku Koivu participated in his 1,000th NHL game.
On March 24, 2012, Boston Bruins defenceman Zdeno Chara participated in his 1,000th NHL game.
On March 25, 2012, Phoenix Coyotes defenceman Derek Morris participated in his 1,000th NHL game.
On March 30, 2012, Nashville Predators coach Barry Trotz won his 500th game as an NHL coach. He became the 17th coach in league history to reach this milestone.
On March 31, 2012, Phoenix Coyotes forward Ray Whitney recorded his 1,000th NHL point. He became the 79th player in league history to reach this milestone.
On April 5, 2012, New York Islanders defenceman Steve Staios participated in his 1,000th NHL game.
On June 11, 2012, the Los Angeles Kings won their first Stanley Cup in franchise history, becoming the first eighth seed to win the Cup.

See also
 2011 in sports
 2012 in sports

References

External links

2011–12 NHL season at Hockey Reference
2011–12 NHL season at ESPN

 
1
1